Elmaddin Mammadov (born on 9 October 1995), is an Azerbaijani footballer who plays as a goalkeeper for TC Sports Club in the Dhivehi Premier League. He defended the colors of the youth (up to 15, 17 and up to 19 years old) and youth teams of Azerbaijan.

Biography
Elmaddin Mammadov was born on October 9, 1995, in Baku.

In 2003-2014 he studied at the secondary school No. 247 in Baku.

Career

Club career

Early career
He started playing football at the age of 9, in the children's football school of the AZAL club, of which he is a pupil.

Professional career

AZAL
He began his professional career as a football player in the reserve squad of FC AZAL in 2011.

Alga Bishkek
In 2016–2017, for the first time in his career, he becomes a legionnaire. By signing an annual contract with the club of the Premier League of Kyrgyzstan - "Alga" FC. He also plays one game in the Kyrgyzstan Cup.

Tskhinvali
In the 2018–2019 season, he spent one season in the club of the first Georgian league - "Tskhinvali". Played 8 games in the championship. He also played one game in the Georgian Cup.

St. Andrews
In 2019-2020 for 4 months he played in the team "St. Andrews" in the top division of the championship of Malta.

TC Sports Club
In 2020, Mammadov signed for Maldivian side TC Sports Club.

International career
He has experience in playing for the youth teams of Azerbaijan under 15, 17 and 19 years old, as well as for the youth team of Azerbaijan under 21 years old.

U-19
He made his debut in the Azerbaijan youth team U19 on March 22, 2013, in a friendly match against the Estonian youth team U17. Spent on the field all 90 minutes of the match.

References

External links
 
 Профиль игрока на сайте footballdatabase
 championat.com
 Азербайджанский голкипер - о своем дебюте: Попасть в сборную, играя на Мальдивах? Это невозможно. azerisport.com
 Эльмаддин Мамедов: «Болельщики на Мальдивах очень приветливы». br.az
 Elməddin Məmmədov Qırğızıstandan “Səbail”ə baxışa gəlməyə razı olmayıb. football-plus.az

Living people
1995 births
People from Baku
Azerbaijani footballers
Association football goalkeepers
AZAL PFK players
FC Baku players
Zira FK players
Sabah FC (Azerbaijan) players
Azerbaijan under-21 international footballers
Azerbaijani expatriate footballers
Expatriate footballers in Kyrgyzstan
FC Alga Bishkek players
Expatriate footballers in Malta
Expatriate footballers in Georgia (country)
St. Andrews F.C. players
Expatriate footballers in the Maldives
T.C. Sports Club players
Azerbaijani expatriate sportspeople in Georgia (country)
Azerbaijani expatriate sportspeople in Malta
Azerbaijani expatriate sportspeople in the Maldives
Azerbaijani expatriate sportspeople in Kyrgyzstan